The 2012 IAAF World Challenge was the third edition of the annual, global circuit of one-day track and field competitions organized by the International Association of Athletics Federations (IAAF). The series featured a total of fourteen meetings – the same number as the previous year as the IAAF World Challenge Dakar and Brothers Znamensky Memorial meetings were dropped to the schedule while the Moscow Challenge and Ponce Grand Prix de Atletismo were added.

Schedule

References

External links
Official website

2012
World Challenge Meetings